Pier 57 is a long pier located in the Hudson River on the West Side of Manhattan in New York City. Opened in December 1954, it sits at the end of West 15th Street on Eleventh Avenue (West Side Highway), just south of the Chelsea Piers sports complex. It underwent renovations starting in the early 2010s.

Design

Consisting of two stories above the waterline, the pier also has a concrete basement resting on the riverbed, and an Art Deco-style metal enclosure at the west end with stainless-steel signage reading "MARINE & AVIATION" and displaying the identifying designation "PIER 57". The headhouse at the east end of the pier is steel-framed with a brick exterior, bearing similar signage. The long sides of the structure are each topped with a line of continuous "burton" cargo handling frames, which allowed freight to be easily transferred to and from ships docked at the pier.

The pier is notable for being underpinned by three separate submerged buoyant concrete caissons, which are spanned by long steel girders supporting the building above. Designer Emil Praeger of the firm Madigan-Hyland had created similar structures as part of the American military effort in World War II, including temporary breakwaters that were used as part of the D-Day invasion. The caissons were constructed in 1951 and 1952 inside a diked and drained pond in Grassy Point near Haverstraw, New York, and after completion were floated down the Hudson to the site. Their buoyancy supports 90% of the pier's weight, with the riverbed supporting the rest. The caissons, often referred to as concrete boxes and dubbed "Cheeseboxes" during construction, are laid out in a T-shape, with the two caissons of equal dimensions laid out from west-to-east, and the third from north-to-south. The caissons were placed on top of the wooden pilings of the original wooden pier, which were filled with sand and gravel. Dubbed "The World's Most Modern Pier" and the "Superpier", it was hailed as an innovative structure, being fireproof, extremely durable and immune to many of the problems that had historically plagued wooden waterfront construction.

History

Construction 

Prior to the construction of the current Pier 57, a wooden pier also called Pier 57 was located at the site, built in 1907 at the cost of $1.2 million. It was leased to the Grace Line in 1939. On September 29, 1947, a large fire engulfed the pier lasting several days into early October. Over 200 firefighters were dispatched to the blaze, along with numerous fireboats including the John J. Harvey. The fire originated in the structure's wooden support piles, and the fire was attributed to either the preservation of the piles with creosote or another oil substance, or the accumulation of fuel in the wooden beams. The damage was estimated at $5 million.

Shortly after the fire, a replacement pier was planned, with the concrete caisson supports selected to provide a fireproof base. Construction began on August 30, 1950. By September 18, 1952, the three concrete boxes were installed. At the time of its construction, Pier 57 was the largest dock building effort ever undertaken by the City of New York. During construction, a gasoline fire at the site in 1953 killed two workers and injured a third. Final construction costs totaled $12 million. The designers were awarded the Architectural League of New York's Gold Medal in Engineering for this innovative design in 1955.

Maritime use 
The pier was dedicated on March 5, 1954, and opened on December 29, 1954. In attendance of both events were Mayor Robert F. Wagner Jr. and city Fire Commissioner Edward Francis Cavanagh, Jr., who had been the Department of Marine and Aviation commissioner that oversaw the planning of the pier. The Grace Line began serving the pier on March 7, 1955 after a dispute with the International Longshoremen's Association. From its opening, the pier served as a terminal for shipping and storage of cargo for the company, replacing the original wooden structure. The company sold its shipping business in 1967. From 1971 until 2003, Pier 57 housed the Hudson Pier Bus Depot for the New York City Transit Authority (NYCTA). The pier was vacated in 2004.

About one year after the NYCTA vacated the pier, Pier 57 was temporarily utilized as a detention center during the 2004 Republican National Convention, when approximately 1,200 anti-RNC protesters were arrested and sent to a makeshift detention/processing center at Pier 57.  Over 1,800 were arrested during the entire event, giving rise to the nickname "Guantanamo on the Hudson" for the temporary facility.  Medical activists reportedly treated many people held at Pier 57 for chemical burns, rashes, and infections that resulted from direct, prolonged exposure to the motor oil, asbestos, and other contaminants from its days as a bus garage.

Redevelopment 
In recognition of its historic engineering significance, the structure was placed on the New York State and National Registers of Historic Places in 2004, but since that time it has been completely disused. Past proposals for re-use have included a 2004 competitive process pitting an extension of the nearby Chelsea Piers sports complex against "Leonardo at Pier 57", an Italian cultural center that was to be operated by Cipriani S.A. However, an investigation by the DA's office sparked by an anonymous tip regarding financial irregularities caused the Cipriani team to back out and scuttled the process.

In 2009, the Hudson River Park Trust selected Youngwoo & Associates to redevelop the site. The current concept, dubbed the SuperPier after a nickname given to the structure in a 1952 Popular Mechanics article, includes a retail shopping environment based on salvaged steel shipping containers and re-use of the roof and concrete-encased basement space below the waterline, as well as incubator office rental spaces for start-up companies. The office spaces will be developed and leased by RXR Realty. The structure would contain offices for Google, which also had offices in the nearby 111 Eighth Avenue building. The renovated Pier 57 building was originally also supposed to include Bourdain Market, a food market by the TV chef Anthony Bourdain, but plans for the market were scrapped in late 2017.

The developers originally projected a spring 2017 re-opening for the site, but by March 2017, that had been pushed back to at least 2018. The structure topped out in June 2017, in advance of a proposed summer 2018 opening. After Bourdain Market canceled its plans to move into Pier 57, Google signed a lease to occupy additional space in the portion of the building where Bourdain Market would have been located. By that time, Pier 57 was expected to open in 2019. In October 2020, City Winery opened a  space at Pier 57. In April 2022, the rooftop park opened.

See also
List of piers in New York City

References

External links 

Hudson River Park
"Notes From the RNC - The 8/31 Experience" Eric Corley's report of his experience being detained at Pier 57 during the RNC 2004 Convention

Buildings and structures on the National Register of Historic Places in Manhattan
Chelsea, Manhattan
Eleventh Avenue (Manhattan)
57
Piers on the National Register of Historic Places
Transportation buildings and structures on the National Register of Historic Places in New York City
57
West Side Highway